The National Historical Archive of Spain (Archivo Histórico Nacional) is based in Serrano Street in Madrid.
It was founded in the nineteenth century when it shared a building with the Real Academía de la Historia.

The collections of the Archive include sections housed outside Madrid, for example the General Archive of the Spanish Civil War in Salamanca.

See also
National Archives of Spain

Further reading

External links

Official Website
 Archivo Histórico Nacional en el Centro Virtual Cervantes

Archives in Spain
Spain